Heitmann is a German surname. Notable people with the surname include:

Anne Heitmann, German poet and writer
Axel C. Heitmann (born 1959), German business executive
Edward Heitmann (1878–1934), Australian politician
Eric Heitmann (born 1980), American footballer
John H. Heitmann (1842–1894), American politician
René Heitmann (born 1942), Danish modern pentathlete

See also
Heitman

German-language surnames